Allyn C. Vine (1914–1994) was a physicist and oceanographer who was a leader in developing crewed submersible vessels to explore the deep sea.

Projects
 Major contributor to redesigning the Bathythermograph during World War II. His version could be used on submarines the detect ocean thermocline.
 Inspiration for DSV Alvin

See also
 Maurice Ewing

References

American oceanographers
American physicists
Woods Hole Oceanographic Institution